State Route 574 (SR 574) is a major east–west section line arterial roadway in the Las Vegas Valley of Nevada.

Route description

State Route 574 begins at U.S. Route 95 in northwest Las Vegas and heads east along Cheyenne Avenue. SR 574 then has an intersection at Rancho Drive (SR 599). At Decatur Boulevard, SR 574 enters North Las Vegas, skirting the northern edge of the North Las Vegas Airport. The highway continues east to intersect Interstate 15 and U.S. Route 93 and serves the main campus of the College of Southern Nevada. At Pecos Road, SR 574 enters the unincorporated town of Sunrise Manor where the highway has an intersection at Las Vegas Boulevard (SR 604) and continues eastward to its terminus at Nellis Boulevard (SR 612), near the southwest corner of Nellis Air Force Base.

Major intersections

Public transport
RTC Transit Route 218 functions on this road.

See also

References

574
Streets in Las Vegas
Streets in North Las Vegas, Nevada